The International Covenant on Civil and Political Rights (ICCPR) is a multilateral treaty that commits nations to respect the civil and political rights of individuals, including the right to life, freedom of religion, freedom of speech, freedom of assembly, electoral rights and rights to due process and a fair trial. It was adopted by United Nations General Assembly Resolution 2200A (XXI) on 16 December 1966 and entered into force on 23 March 1976 after its thirty-fifth ratification or accession. , the Covenant has 173 parties and six more signatories without ratification, most notably the People's Republic of China and Cuba; North Korea is the only state that has tried to withdraw.

The ICCPR is considered a seminal document in the history of international law and human rights, forming part of the International Bill of Human Rights, along with the International Covenant on Economic, Social and Cultural Rights (ICESCR) and the Universal Declaration of Human Rights (UDHR).

Compliance with the ICCPR is monitored by the United Nations Human Rights Committee, which reviews regular reports of states parties on how the rights are being implemented. States must report one year after acceding to the Covenant and then whenever the Committee requests (usually every four years). The Committee normally meets at the UN Office at Geneva, Switzerland and typically holds three sessions per year.

History

The ICCPR (International Covenant On Civil and Political Rights) has its roots in the same process that led to the Universal Declaration of Human Rights. A "Declaration on the Essential Rights of Man" had been proposed at the 1945 San Francisco Conference which led to the founding of the United Nations, and the Economic and Social Council was given the task of drafting it. Early on in the process, the document was split into a declaration setting forth general principles of human rights, and a convention or covenant containing binding commitments. The former evolved into the UDHR and was adopted on 10 December 1948.

Drafting continued on the convention, but there remained significant differences between UN members on the relative importance of negative Civil and Political versus positive Economic, Social and Cultural Rights. These eventually caused the convention to be split into two separate covenants, "one to contain civil and political rights and the other to contain economic, social and cultural rights". The two covenants were to contain as many similar provisions as possible, and be opened for signature simultaneously. Each would also contain an article on the right of all peoples to self-determination.

The first document became the International Covenant on Civil and Political Rights and the second the International Covenant on Economic, Social and Cultural Rights. The drafts were presented to the UN General Assembly for discussion in 1954 and adopted in 1966. As a result of diplomatic negotiations the International Covenant on Economic, Social and Cultural Rights was adopted shortly before the International Covenant on Civil and Political Rights.
Together, the UDHR and the two Covenants are considered to be the foundational human rights texts in the contemporary international system of human rights.

Articles of the Covenant
The Covenant follows the structure of the UDHR and ICESCR, with a preamble and fifty-three articles, divided into six parts.

Part 1 (Article 1) recognizes the right of all peoples to self-determination, including the right to "freely determine their political status", pursue their economic, social and cultural goals, and manage and dispose of their own resources. It recognises a negative right of a people not to be deprived of its means of subsistence, and imposes an obligation on those parties still responsible for non-self governing and trust territories (colonies) to encourage and respect their self-determination.

Part 2 (Articles 2 – 5) obliges parties to legislate where necessary to give effect to the rights recognised in the Covenant, and to provide an effective legal remedy for any violation of those rights. It also requires the rights be recognised "without distinction of any kind, such as race, colour, sex, language, religion, political or other opinion, national or social origin, property, birth or other status," and to ensure that they are enjoyed equally by women. The rights can only be limited "in time of public emergency which threatens the life of the nation," and even then no derogation is permitted from the rights to life, freedom from torture and slavery, the freedom from retrospective law, the right to personhood, and freedom of thought, conscience, religion and freedom from medical or scientific experimentation without consent.

Part 3 (Articles 6 – 27) lists the rights themselves. These include rights to:

 physical integrity, in the form of the right to life and freedom from torture and slavery (Articles 6, 7, and 8);
 liberty and security of the person, in the form of freedom from arbitrary arrest and detention and the right to habeas corpus (Articles 9 – 11);
 procedural fairness in law, in the form of rights to due process, a fair and impartial trial, the presumption of innocence, and recognition as a person before the law (Articles 14, 15, and 16);
 individual liberty, in the form of the freedoms of movement, thought, conscience and religion, speech, association and assembly, family rights, the right to a nationality, and the right to privacy (Articles 12, 13, 17 – 24);
 prohibition of any propaganda for war as well as any advocacy of national or religious hatred that constitutes incitement to discrimination, hostility or violence by law (Article 20);
 political participation, including the right to the right to vote (Article 25);
 Non-discrimination, minority rights and equality before the law (Articles 26 and 27).

Many of these rights include specific actions which must be undertaken to realize them.

Part 4 (Articles 28 – 45) governs the establishment and operation of the Human Rights Committee and the reporting and monitoring of the Covenant. It also allows parties to recognize the competence of the committee to resolve disputes between parties on the implementation of the Covenant (Articles 41 and 42).

Part 5 (Articles 46 – 47) clarifies that the Covenant shall not be interpreted as interfering with the operation of the United Nations or "the inherent right of all peoples to enjoy and utilize fully and freely their natural wealth and resources".

Part 6 (Articles 48–53) governs ratification, entry into force, and amendment of the Covenant.

Rights to physical integrity

Article 6 of the Covenant recognises the individual's "inherent right to life" and requires it to be protected by law. It is a "supreme right" from which no derogation can be permitted, and must be interpreted widely. It therefore requires parties to take positive measures to reduce infant mortality and increase life expectancy, as well as forbidding arbitrary killings by security forces.

While Article 6 does not prohibit the death penalty, it restricts its application to the "most serious crimes" and forbids it to be used on children and pregnant women or in a manner contrary to the Convention on the Prevention and Punishment of the Crime of Genocide. The UN Human Rights Committee interprets the Article as "strongly suggest[ing] that abolition is desirable", and regards any progress towards abolition of the death penalty as advancing this right. The Second Optional Protocol commits its signatories to the abolition of the death penalty within their borders.

Article 7 prohibits torture, cruel, inhuman or degrading punishment and non-consensual medical or scientific experimentation. As with Article 6, it cannot be derogated from under any circumstances. The article is now interpreted to impose similar obligations to those required by the United Nations Convention Against Torture, including not just prohibition of torture, but active measures to prevent its use and a prohibition on refoulement. In response to Nazi human experimentation during WW2 this article explicitly includes a prohibition on medical and scientific experimentation without consent.

Article 8 prohibits slavery and enforced servitude in all situations. The article also prohibits forced labour, with exceptions for criminal punishment, military service and civil obligations.

Liberty and security of person

Article 9 recognises the rights to liberty and security of the person. It prohibits arbitrary arrest and detention, requires any deprivation of liberty to be according to law, and obliges parties to allow those deprived of their liberty to challenge their imprisonment through the courts. These provisions apply not just to those imprisoned as part of the criminal process, but also to those detained due to mental illness, drug addiction, or for educational or immigration purposes.

Articles 9.3 and 9.4 impose procedural safeguards around arrest, requiring anyone arrested to be promptly informed of the charges against them, and to be brought promptly before a judge. It also restricts the use of pre-trial detention, requiring that it not be 'the general rule'.

Article 10 requires anyone deprived of liberty to be treated with dignity and humanity. This applies not just to prisoners, but also to those detained for immigration purposes or psychiatric care. The right complements the Article 7 prohibition on torture and cruel, inhuman or degrading treatment. The article also imposes specific obligations around criminal justice, requiring prisoners in pretrial detention to be separated from convicted prisoners, and children to be separated from adults. It requires prisons to be focused on reform and rehabilitation rather than punishment.

Article 11 prohibits the use of imprisonment as a punishment for breach of contract.

Procedural fairness and rights of the accused

Article 14 recognizes and protects a right to justice and a fair trial.  Article 14.1 establishes the ground rules: everyone must be equal before the courts, and any hearing must take place in open court before a competent, independent and impartial tribunal, with any judgment or ruling made public. Closed hearings are only permitted for reasons of privacy, justice, or national security, and judgments may only be suppressed in divorce cases or to protect the interests of children. These obligations apply to both criminal and civil hearings, and to all courts and tribunals. Article 14.3 mandates that litigants must be informed promptly and in detail in a language which they understand.

The rest of the article imposes specific and detailed obligations around the process of criminal trials in order to protect the rights of the accused and the right to a fair trial. It establishes the Presumption of innocence and forbids double jeopardy. It requires that those convicted of a crime be allowed to appeal to a higher tribunal, and requires victims of a Miscarriage of justice to be compensated. It establishes rights to a speedy trial, to counsel, against self-incrimination, and for the accused to be present and call and examine witnesses.

Article 15 prohibits prosecutions under ex post facto law and the imposition of retrospective criminal penalties, and requires the imposition of the lesser penalty where criminal sentences have changed between the offence and conviction. But except the criminal according to general principles of law recognized by international community. (jus cogens)

Article 16 requires states to recognize everyone as a person before the law.

Individual liberties

Article 12 guarantees freedom of movement, including the right of persons to choose their residence, to leave and return to a country. These rights apply to legal aliens as well as citizens of a state, and can be restricted only where necessary to protect national security, public order or health, and the rights and freedoms of others. The article also recognises a right of people to enter their own country: the right of return. The Human Rights Committee interprets this right broadly as applying not just to citizens, but also to those stripped of or denied their nationality. They also regard it as near-absolute; "there are few, if any, circumstances in which deprivation of the right to enter one's own country could be reasonable".

Article 13 forbids the arbitrary expulsion of resident aliens and requires such decisions to be able to be appealed and reviewed.

Article 17 mandates the right of privacy. This provision, specifically article 17(1), protects private adult consensual sexual activity, thereby nullifying prohibitions on homosexual behaviour, however, the wording of this covenant's marriage right (Article 23) excludes the extrapolation of a same-sex marriage right from this provision.
Article 17 also protects people against unlawful attacks to their honor and reputation. Article 17 (2) grants the protection of the law against such attacks.

Article 18 mandates freedom of religion or belief.

Article 19 mandates freedom of expression.

Article 20 mandates sanctions against inciting war and hatred.

Article 21 mandates freedom of assembly and 22 mandates freedom of association. These provisions guarantee the right to freedom of association, the right to trade unions and also defines the International Labour Organization.

Article 23 mandates the right of marriage. The wording of this provision neither requires nor prohibits same-sex marriage.

Article 24 mandates special protection, the right to a name, and the right to a nationality for every child.

Article 27 mandates the rights of ethnic, religious and linguistic minority to enjoy their own culture, to profess their own religion, and to use their own language.

Political rights
Article 3 provides an accessory non-discrimination principle. Accessory in the way that it cannot be used independently and can only be relied upon in relation to another right protected by the ICCPR.

In contrast, Article 26 contains a revolutionary norm by providing an autonomous equality principle which is not dependent upon another right under the convention being infringed. This has the effect of widening the scope of the non-discrimination principle beyond the scope of ICCPR.

Optional protocols
There are two Optional Protocols to the Covenant. The First Optional Protocol establishes an individual complaints mechanism, allowing individuals to complain to the Human Rights Committee about violations of the Covenant. This has led to the creation of a complex jurisprudence on the interpretation and implementation of the Covenant.  , the First Optional Protocol has 116 parties.

The Second Optional Protocol abolishes the death penalty; however, countries were permitted to make a reservation allowing for use of death penalty for the most serious crimes of a military nature, committed during wartime. , the Second Optional Protocol had 90 parties.

Reservations

A number of parties have made reservations and interpretative declarations to their application of the Covenant.

Argentina will apply the fair trial rights guaranteed in its constitution to the prosecution of those accused of violating the general law of nations.

Australia reserves the right to progressively implement the prison standards of Article 10, to compensate for miscarriages of justice by administrative means rather than through the courts, and interprets the prohibition on racial incitement as being subject to the freedoms of expression, association and assembly. It also declares that its implementation will be effected at each level of its federal system.

Austria reserves the right to continue to exile members of the House of Habsburg, and limits the rights of the accused and the right to a fair trial to those already existing in its legal system.

Bahamas, due to problems with implementation, reserves the right not to compensate for miscarriages of justice.

Bahrain interprets Articles 3 (no sexual discrimination), 18 (freedom of religion) and 23 (family rights) within the context of Islamic Sharia law.

Bangladesh reserves the right to try people in absentia where they are fugitives from justice and declares that resource constraints mean that it cannot necessarily segregate prisons or provide counsel for accused persons.

Barbados reserves the right not to provide free counsel for accused persons due to resource constraints.

Belgium interprets the freedoms of speech, assembly and association in a manner consistent with the European Convention on Human Rights. It does not consider itself obliged to ban war propaganda as required by Article 20, and interprets that article in light of the freedom of expression in the UDHR.

Belize reserves the right not to compensate for miscarriages of justice, due to problems with implementation, and does not plan to provide free legal counsel for the same reasons as above. It also refuses to ensure the right to free travel at any time, due to a law requiring those travelling abroad to provide tax clearance certificates.

Congo, as per the Congolese Code of Civil, Commercial, Administrative and Financial Procedure, in matters of private law, decisions or orders emanating from conciliation proceedings may be enforced through imprisonment for debt.

Denmark reserves the right to exclude the press and the public from trials as per its own laws. Reservation is further made to Article 20, paragraph 1. This reservation is in accordance with the vote cast by Denmark in the XVI General Assembly of the United Nations in 1961 when the Danish Delegation, referring to the preceding article concerning freedom of expression, voted against the prohibition against propaganda for war.

The Gambia, as per its constitution, will provide free legal assistance for accused persons charged with capital offences only.

Pakistan, has made several reservations to the articles in the convention;  "the provisions of Articles 3, 6, 7, 18 and 19 shall be so applied to the extent that they are not repugnant to the Provisions of the Constitution of Pakistan and the Sharia laws", "the provisions of Article 12 shall be so applied as to be in conformity with the Provisions of the Constitution of Pakistan", "With respect to Article 13, the Government of the Islamic Republic of Pakistan reserves its right to apply its law relating to foreigners", "the provisions of Article 25 shall be so applied to the extent that they are not repugnant to the Provisions of the Constitution of Pakistan" and the Government of the Islamic Republic of Pakistan "does not recognize the competence of the Committee provided for in Article 40 of the Covenant".

The United States has made reservations that none of the articles should restrict the right of free speech and association; that the US government may impose capital punishment on any person other than a pregnant woman, including persons below the age of 18; that "cruel, inhuman and degrading treatment or punishment" refers to those treatments or punishments prohibited by one or more of the fifth, eighth, and fourteenth amendments to the US Constitution; that the third clause of Paragraph 1, Article 15 will not apply; and that, notwithstanding paragraphs 2(b) and 3 of Article 10 and paragraph 4 of Article 14, the US government may treat juveniles as adults, and accept volunteers to the military prior to the age of 18. The United States also submitted five "understandings", and four "declarations".

Implementation and effects
The International Covenant on Civil and Political Rights has 167 states parties, 67 by signature and ratification, and the remainder by accession or succession. Another five states have signed but have yet to ratify the treaty.

According to a 2013 study, the ICCPR has significantly improved human rights practices on matters where evidence-production costs and standards of proof are low, but has had a limited impact for issue areas where legally admissible evidence is costly to produce and standards of proof are high. This means that the ICCPR has "significantly improved governments' respect for the freedoms of speech, association, assembly, and religion" but has had insignificant effects on respect to personal integrity rights.

Australia
The Covenant is not directly enforceable in Australia, but its provisions support a number of domestic laws, which confer enforceable rights on individuals. For example, Article 17 of the convention has been implemented by the Australian Privacy Act 1988. Likewise, the Covenant's equality and anti-discrimination provisions support the federal  Disability Discrimination Act 1992. Finally, the Covenant is one of the major sources of 'human rights' listed in the Human Rights (Parliamentary Scrutiny) Act 2011. This law requires most new legislation and administrative instruments (such as delegated/subordinate legislation) to be tabled in parliament with a statement outlining the proposed law's compatibility with the listed human rights A Joint Committee on Human Rights scrutinises all new legislation and statements of compatibility. The findings of the Joint Committee are not legally binding.

Legislation also establishes the Australian Human Rights Commission which allows the Australian Human Rights Commission (AHRC) to examine enacted legislation (to suggest remedial enactments), its administration (to suggest avoidance of practices) and general compliance with the covenant which is scheduled to the AHRC legislation.

In Victoria and the Australian Capital Territory, the convention can be used by a plaintiff or defendant who invokes those jurisdiction's human rights charters. While the Convention cannot be used to overturn a Victorian or ACT law, a Court can issue a 'declaration of incompatibility' that requires the relevant Attorney-General to respond in Parliament within a set time period. Courts in Victoria and the ACT are also directed by the legislation to interpret the law in a way to give effect to a human right, and new legislation and subordinate legislation must be accompanied by a statement of compatibility. Efforts to implement a similar Charter at the national level have been frustrated and Australia's Constitution may prevent conferring the 'declaration' power on federal judges.

Ireland
Ireland's use of Special Criminal Courts where juries are replaced by judges and other special procedures apply has been found to not violate the treaty: "In the Committee's view, trial before courts other than the ordinary courts is not necessarily, per se, a violation of the entitlement to a fair hearing and the facts of the present case do not show that there has been such a violation."

New Zealand
New Zealand took measures to give effect to many of the rights contained within it by passing the New Zealand Bill of Rights Act in 1990, and formally incorporated the status of protected person into law through the passing of the Immigration Act 2009.

Sri Lanka 
Sri Lankan author Shakthika Sathkumara was arrested on 1 April 2019 for inciting religious violence, following a publication of a short story about homosexuality and child abuse at a Buddhist temple in Sri Lanka. The author had been adjudged the best Sinhala language short story writer in Sri Lanka's National Youth Literary Festivals of 2010 and 2014, and was twice the recipient of the north western provincial state literary award. A group of Buddhist monks had stormed the author's workplace demanding punitive action against him after the story first appeared on Facebook; the ICCPR prohibits "advocacy of national, racial or religious hatred that constitutes incitement to discrimination, hostility or violence". Human rights organizations Civicus and the Asian Human Rights Commission (AHRC) have asserted that the charges are spurious and a clear violation of the author's right to freedom of expression.

United States

Reservations, understandings, and declarations
The United States Senate ratified the ICCPR in 1992, with five reservations, five understandings, and four declarations. Some have noted that with so many reservations, its implementation has little domestic effect, although it has been argued that the reason behind the Senate reservations is that Article 20(2) (regarding hate speech) of the ICCPR may be unconstitutional according to Supreme Court precedent. Included in the Senate's ratification was the declaration that "the provisions of Article 1 through 27 of the Covenant are not self-executing", and a Senate Executive Report stated that the declaration was meant to "clarify that the Covenant will not create a private cause of action in U.S. Courts". 

Where a treaty or covenant is not self-executing, and where Congress has not acted to implement the agreement with legislation, no private right of action within the US judicial system is created by ratification. However, a reservation that is "incompatible with the object and purpose" of a treaty is void as a matter of the Vienna Convention on the Law of Treaties and international law, and there is question as to whether the non-self-execution declaration is even constitutional  under the Supremacy Clause (Prof. Louis Henkin argues that it is not). Prof. Jordan Paust criticizes the United States' ratification subject to the non-self-execution declaration as being an abuse of the treaty.

Non-compliance
In 1994, the United Nations' Human Rights Committee expressed concerns with compliance:

Of particular concern are widely formulated reservations which essentially render ineffective all Covenant rights which would require any change in national law to ensure compliance with Covenant obligations. No real international rights or obligations have thus been accepted. And when there is an absence of provisions to ensure that Covenant rights may be sued on in domestic courts, and, further, a failure to allow individual complaints to be brought to the Committee under the first Optional Protocol, all the essential elements of the Covenant guarantees have been removed.

In 2006, the Human Rights Committee expressed concern over what it interprets as material non-compliance, exhorting the United States to take immediate corrective action:

Parties to the Covenant
There are a total of 173 parties to the International Covenant on Civil and Political Rights.

States not party to the Covenant
Most states in the world are parties to the ICCPR. The following 25 states have not become party to it, but six states have signed the Covenant but not ratified it.

Signatories that have signed and not ratified

States which are neither signatories nor parties

Nonmembers of the UN
 
 
 
  (through the Holy See)

See also
 United Nations Human Rights Committee
 United Nations Human Rights Council
 United Nations list of non-self-governing territories
 United Nations General Assembly Resolution 66 (I)
 United Nations General Assembly Resolution 1514 (XV)
 United Nations General Assembly Resolution 1541 (XV)
 United Nations General Assembly Resolution 1654 (XVI)

Notes

References

External links
 Text of the Covenant
 List of signatories and parties
 article 2 Bimonthly publication highlighting article 2 of the ICCPR
 Introductory note by Christian Tomuschat, procedural history note and audiovisual material on the International Covenant on Civil and Political Rights in the Historic Archives of the United Nations Audiovisual Library of International Law
 Lecture by Ruth Wedgwood entitled The Work of the United Nations Human Rights Committee: Enforcing the International Covenant on Civil and Political Rights in the Lecture Series of the United Nations Audiovisual Library of International Law
 Christopher N.J. Roberts: William H. Fitzpatrick’s Editorials on Human Rights (1949), published by Arbeitskreis Menschenrechte im 20. Jahrhundert, published at "Quellen zur Geschichte der Menschenrechte"

Human rights instruments
United Nations treaties
Treaties concluded in 1966
Treaties entered into force in 1976
Treaties of the Democratic Republic of Afghanistan
Treaties of Albania
Treaties of Algeria
Treaties of Andorra
Treaties of the People's Republic of Angola
Treaties of Argentina
Treaties of Armenia
Treaties of Australia
Treaties of Austria
Treaties of Azerbaijan
Treaties of the Bahamas
Treaties of Bahrain
Treaties of Bangladesh
Treaties of Barbados
Treaties of the Byelorussian Soviet Socialist Republic
Treaties of Belgium
Treaties of Belize
Treaties of Benin
Treaties of Bolivia
Treaties of Bosnia and Herzegovina
Treaties of Botswana
Treaties of Brazil
Treaties of the People's Republic of Bulgaria
Treaties of Burkina Faso
Treaties of Burundi
Treaties of the State of Cambodia
Treaties of Cameroon
Treaties of Canada
Treaties of Cape Verde
Treaties of the Central African Republic
Treaties of Chad
Treaties of Chile
Treaties extended to British Hong Kong
Treaties extended to Portuguese Macau
Treaties of Colombia
Treaties of the Comoros
Treaties of the Republic of the Congo
Treaties of Costa Rica
Treaties of Ivory Coast
Treaties of Croatia
Treaties of Cyprus
Treaties of the Czech Republic
Treaties of Czechoslovakia
Treaties of North Korea
Treaties of Zaire
Treaties of Denmark
Treaties of Djibouti
Treaties of Dominica
Treaties of the Dominican Republic
Treaties of Ecuador
Treaties of Egypt
Treaties of El Salvador
Treaties of Equatorial Guinea
Treaties of Eritrea
Treaties of Estonia
Treaties of the Transitional Government of Ethiopia
Treaties of Finland
Treaties of France
Treaties of Gabon
Treaties of the Gambia
Treaties of Georgia (country)
Treaties of West Germany
Treaties of East Germany
Treaties of Ghana
Treaties of Greece
Treaties of Grenada
Treaties of Guatemala
Treaties of Guinea
Treaties of Guinea-Bissau
Treaties of Guyana
Treaties of Haiti
Treaties of Honduras
Treaties of the Hungarian People's Republic
Treaties of Iceland
Treaties of India
Treaties of Indonesia
Treaties of Pahlavi Iran
Treaties of Ba'athist Iraq
Treaties of Ireland
Treaties of Israel
Treaties of Italy
Treaties of Jamaica
Treaties of Japan
Treaties of Jordan
Treaties of Kazakhstan
Treaties of Kenya
Treaties of Kuwait
Treaties of Kyrgyzstan
Treaties of Laos
Treaties of Latvia
Treaties of Lebanon
Treaties of Lesotho
Treaties of Liberia
Treaties of the Libyan Arab Republic
Treaties of Liechtenstein
Treaties of Lithuania
Treaties of Luxembourg
Treaties of Madagascar
Treaties of Malawi
Treaties of the Maldives
Treaties of Mali
Treaties of Malta
Treaties of Mauritania
Treaties of Mauritius
Treaties of Mexico
Treaties of Monaco
Treaties of the Mongolian People's Republic
Treaties of Montenegro
Treaties of Morocco
Treaties of Mozambique
Treaties of Namibia
Treaties of Nauru
Treaties of Nepal
Treaties of the Netherlands
Treaties of New Zealand
Treaties of Nicaragua
Treaties of Niger
Treaties of Nigeria
Treaties of Norway
Treaties of Pakistan
Treaties of the State of Palestine
Treaties of Palau
Treaties of Panama
Treaties of Papua New Guinea
Treaties of Paraguay
Treaties of Peru
Treaties of the Philippines
Treaties of the Polish People's Republic
Treaties of Portugal
Treaties of South Korea
Treaties of Moldova
Treaties of the Socialist Republic of Romania
Treaties of the Soviet Union
Treaties of Rwanda
Treaties of Saint Lucia
Treaties of Saint Vincent and the Grenadines
Treaties of Samoa
Treaties of San Marino
Treaties of São Tomé and Príncipe
Treaties of Senegal
Treaties of Serbia and Montenegro
Treaties of Seychelles
Treaties of Sierra Leone
Treaties of Slovakia
Treaties of Slovenia
Treaties of the Somali Democratic Republic
Treaties of South Africa
Treaties of Spain
Treaties of Sri Lanka
Treaties of the Democratic Republic of the Sudan
Treaties of Suriname
Treaties of Eswatini
Treaties of Sweden
Treaties of Switzerland
Treaties of Syria
Treaties of Tajikistan
Treaties of Thailand
Treaties of North Macedonia
Treaties of East Timor
Treaties of Togo
Treaties of Trinidad and Tobago
Treaties of Tunisia
Treaties of Turkey
Treaties of Turkmenistan
Treaties of Uganda
Treaties of the Ukrainian Soviet Socialist Republic
Treaties of the United Kingdom
Treaties of Tanzania
Treaties of the United States
Treaties of Uruguay
Treaties of Uzbekistan
Treaties of Vanuatu
Treaties of Venezuela
Treaties of Vietnam
Treaties of the Yemen Arab Republic
Treaties of Yugoslavia
Treaties of Zambia
Treaties of Zimbabwe
1966 in New York City
Treaties adopted by United Nations General Assembly resolutions
Treaties extended to Bermuda
Treaties extended to the British Virgin Islands
Treaties extended to the Cayman Islands
Treaties extended to the Falkland Islands
Treaties extended to Gibraltar
Treaties extended to Guernsey
Treaties extended to the Isle of Man
Treaties extended to Jersey
Treaties extended to Montserrat
Treaties extended to the Pitcairn Islands
Treaties extended to Saint Helena, Ascension and Tristan da Cunha
Treaties extended to the Turks and Caicos Islands
Treaties extended to the Netherlands Antilles
Treaties extended to Aruba
Treaties extended to the Faroe Islands
Treaties extended to Greenland
Treaties extended to the British Solomon Islands
Treaties extended to British Honduras
Treaties extended to the Gilbert and Ellice Islands
Treaties extended to West Berlin
Treaties of Fiji